Hoplodoris bifurcata is a species of sea slug, a dorid nudibranch, a marine gastropod mollusc in the family Discodorididae''.

Distribution
This species is recorded from Japan and Hawaii.

References

Discodorididae
Gastropods described in 1993